Broka Island is a rocky island,  long and rising to , with a prominent cove indenting the north side, situated  north of Law Promontory and  west of Havstein Island. It was mapped by Norwegian cartographers from aerial photographs taken by the Lars Christensen Expedition, 1936–37. They applied the name Broka (the trousers) because the outline of the island resembles that of a pair of trousers.

See also 
 Lang Sound, a sound lying between the group of islands that includes Broka Island
 List of Antarctic and sub-Antarctic islands

References

External links

Islands of Kemp Land